Catherine Truitt (born 1970/1971) is an American educator and politician who has served as the 24th North Carolina superintendent of public instruction since January 2, 2021. A member of the Republican Party, Truitt previously served as senior advisor on education to North Carolina governor Pat McCrory from 2015 to 2017. She has been the chancellor of the online Western Governors University North Carolina since its establishment in 2017.

Education
Truitt studied English at the University of Maryland, where she earned a Bachelor of Arts degree in 1994. She went on to earn a Master of Education from the University of Washington in 1997.

Career

Teaching career
According to Truitt, her husband Jeff's role in the U.S. Navy Reserves resulted in frequent moves, and she taught in a variety of locations, including at West Johnston High School in Benson, North Carolina from 2009 to 2012.

Senior education advisor to Governor McCrory
In October 2015, North Carolina governor Pat McCrory announced his selection of Truitt for senior education advisor to replace Eric Guckian, who left to work for the nonprofit Leadership for Educational Equity. In his announcement, McCrory said that Truitt's selection would "help us to build on the progress we’ve made to ensure every North Carolina student is equipped with the skills they need to begin a career or further their education." Truitt met with demonstrators during a June 2016 protest of McCrory's education policies.

She stayed in the role until McCrory left office after the 2016 gubernatorial election.

Western Governors University North Carolina
Truitt received an offer in 2017 to serve as chancellor of a new North Carolina affiliate of the online college Western Governors University. She accepted and the school was established in October 2017.

North Carolina superintendent of public instruction

In the run-up to the 2020 elections, Truitt said she would consider a run for North Carolina superintendent of public instruction if incumbent Mark Johnson did not run again. Johnson announced his bid for lieutenant governor in November 2019, and Truitt subsequently entered the race for state superintendent.

Truitt defeated state representative D. Craig Horn in the Republican primary. In the general election, Truitt defeated Democrat Jen Mangrum. She was sworn in on January 2, 2021, and repeated her oath at Governor Roy Cooper's inaugural ceremony on January 9.

Electoral history

Personal life
Truitt lives in Cary, North Carolina with her husband, Jeff Truitt, a reservist in the U.S. Navy. They have three children.

References

External links
 NC DPI: State Superintendent of Public Instruction official government website
 Catherine Truitt for State Superintendent official campaign website

1970s births
20th-century American educators
21st-century American educators
21st-century American politicians
Living people
North Carolina Republicans
North Carolina Superintendents of Public Instruction
University of Maryland, College Park alumni
University of Washington alumni
Western Governors University people